Duke Georgiy Evseevich Eristov (Eristavi) ( (ერისთავი) Eristavi ; (1769 – 18 November 1863) was a nobleman of the Georgian Eristavi princerely family and general as well as senator of the Russian Empire.

Awards
Order of Saint Alexander Nevsky
Three times Order of Saint Anna
1st Grade with Diamonds
1st Grade
2nd Grade
Order of Saint Vladimir
2nd Grade
4th Grade
Order of Saint George
4th Grade

References

Imperial Russian Army generals
Georgian generals with the rank "General of the Infantry" (Imperial Russia)
Generals from Georgia (country)
Georgian generals in the Imperial Russian Army
19th-century people from Georgia (country)
Nobility of Georgia (country)
1769 births
1863 deaths